KPAI-LP (103.1 FM) is a low-power radio station licensed to Paisley, Oregon, United States. The station is currently owned by Paisley High School.

References

External links
 

PAI-LP
PAI-LP
Lake County, Oregon